
Dietrich von Müller (16 September 1891 – 3 January 1961) was a German general during World War II. Just before the end of World War II he was promoted to Generalleutnant and awarded the Knight's Cross of the Iron Cross with Oak Leaves and Swords.

On 19 April 1945 he was taken prisoner by members of 1st Czechoslovak Partisan Brigade of Jan Žižka and handed over to the Red Army. Convicted as a war criminal in the Soviet Union, he was held until the winter of 1955.

References

Citations

Bibliography

 
 
 

1891 births
1961 deaths
Lieutenant generals of the German Army (Wehrmacht)
Recipients of the Gold German Cross
Recipients of the Knight's Cross of the Iron Cross with Oak Leaves and Swords
German prisoners of war in World War II held by the Soviet Union
People from Mecklenburgische Seenplatte (district)
Military personnel from Mecklenburg-Western Pomerania
German Army personnel of World War I